Marjan Kovačević (* 8 April 1957) is a Serbian chess problemist.

In 1988 Kovačević gained the title International Solving Grandmaster. In 2007 Kovačević gained the title Grandmaster of the FIDE for Chess Compositions.

Examples

Notes

References
 Milan Velimirović and Marjan Kovačević: 2345 Chess problems – Anthology of Chess Combinations. Chess Informant, Belgrade 1997.

External links
 Kovačević problems  at the PDB Server
 

1957 births
Living people
Grandmasters for chess composition
International solving grandmasters
Chess double grandmasters
Serbian chess players